Perryville is an unincorporated community in Hartford Township, Adams County, Indiana.

History
Perryville was named for Perry Glendenning, a storekeeper.

Geography

References

Unincorporated communities in Adams County, Indiana
Unincorporated communities in Indiana